West Hill is an unincorporated community in Cumberland County, Pennsylvania, United States.

Reference

Unincorporated communities in Cumberland County, Pennsylvania
Unincorporated communities in Pennsylvania